The Powers That Be is an American television sitcom that was broadcast on NBC, premiering on March 7, 1992. It was created by David Crane and Marta Kauffman, with Norman Lear as executive producer. It aired for two seasons, with 21 episodes, airing its final episode on NBC on January 2, 1993.

Premise
At the center of the series is U.S. Senator William Powers, a parody of the political establishment in Washington, D.C. Margaret, the senator's status-hungry wife, treats Charlotte, their maid, with comedic disdain. Caitlyn, the senator's daughter, has an eating disorder and is married to Representative Theodore Van Horne, who is suicidal; their son, Pierce, is mature beyond his years from having to care for his unbalanced parents. Sophie Lipkin, the senator's illegitimate daughter, is a loud, crass New Jerseyan who surprises the family when she moves to Washington and begins to bond with her father. The senator's staff includes an intelligent and beautiful aide, Jordan Miller — who is also Powers' mistress — and the feckless aide Bradley Grist.

Cast 
 John Forsythe as William Powers, the senior United States senator from an unnamed New England state. He is a liberal Democrat. Powers is basically a good man who wishes to do the best for his constituents and is kind to his unfortunate maid Charlotte, son-in-law Theodore, and grandson Pierce. However, he is also something of a ladies' man, having an affair with his aide Jordan.
 Holland Taylor as Margaret Powers, William's wife. She is a status-seeking "superbitch" – her only interest is in what others think (when Pierce hacks into his school computer, she says that's fine, but when it is revealed he got caught, she is furious). She ingratiates herself with Hillary Clinton in order to have her husband made Ambassador to Britain, although this only results in her giving people food poisoning. Margaret strongly dislikes Bill's daughter Sophie, but pleads with her not to move out their home, as then Bill's mother would have to stay with them. She is always trying to get one up on her friend, Mimzie. Nancy Reagan once gave Margaret a pistol as a gift.
 Eve Gordon as Jordan Miller, Bill Powers' chief of staff and mistress. She is confident and savvy and is keen to promote her boss's career. She has an Electra complex about the Senator, calling him "Daddy".
 Peter MacNicol as Bradley Grist, Powers' press secretary. Bradley is a parody of political aides. He is willing to do anything to make his boss look good; for example, when Powers is accidentally shot, Bradley's first thought is as to how it can be spun. He is generally unlucky in his flirtations; however, in one episode he does accidentally marry General Gurdy Walker, his mother's best friend, who "hit Schwarzkopf during Desert Storm".
 Valerie Mahaffey as Caitlyn Van Horne, Bill and Margaret's daughter. Caitlyn is very unhappy in her marriage and begins an affair with Joe Bowman, her father's election opponent. Not very bright, and very shallow, Caitlyn is nevertheless quite a sweet-natured woman.
 David Hyde Pierce as Theodore Van Horne, Caitlyn's husband. Theodore was first elected to Congress in 1987, but first made his maiden speech in 1993- it was the shortest speech ever made in the House. He is incredibly shy and often suicidal, but he is friends with his son Pierce.
 Elizabeth Berridge as Charlotte, Bill and Margaret's maid. Charlotte is very deferential and quiet. However, she falls in love with Theodore. Margaret abuses her, and she does leave in one episode.
 Joseph Gordon-Levitt as Pierce Van Horne, Caitlyn and Theodore's son, who is more clever than his parents, and manages to hack into his school's computer.
 Robin Bartlett as Sophie Lipkin, Bill's illegitimate daughter from a liaison in Korea. She was brought up by a Jewish mother in New Jersey. She lived with a man called Larry but left him because of his inconsiderate behaviour. Margaret and Caitlyn avidly dislike Sophie as she is loud and irrepressible- but ironically, she is a far smoother political operator than the two Establishment insiders. Sophie works in Bill's office.

Legacy
Although the program was short lived, several of the principals subsequently became involved in long-running and popular sitcoms created after the show's demise. Series creators Crane and Kauffman went on to develop Friends, which lasted 10 years. Among the actors, Joseph Gordon-Levitt took a role in 3rd Rock from the Sun, Robin Bartlett played a recurring part on Mad About You, Peter MacNicol would soon reach fame with a similar eccentric character (as John Cage) in FOX's Ally McBeal, and David Hyde Pierce was chosen for his role as Niles Crane in the series Frasier partly on the basis of his work in this program. Holland Taylor had a high-profile role on the CBS sitcom Two and a Half Men.

In a 2021 interview, Taylor mentioned the show, saying "I did this fantastic show for Norman Lear called Powers That Be. The network didn’t really understand what they had on their hands, and it did not have a long life, much to everyone’s sorrow. It was a wonderful satire."

Episodes

Series overview

Season 1 (1992)

Season 2 (1992–93)

See also
All's Fair

References

External links
 

NBC original programming
1990s American sitcoms
1992 American television series debuts
1993 American television series endings
Powers that Be
Television shows set in Washington, D.C.
1990s American political television series
English-language television shows
Television series by Castle Rock Entertainment
Television series created by David Crane (producer)
Television series created by Marta Kauffman